Adelanto Elementary School District (AESD) is an elementary and middle school-only school district in San Bernardino County, California. It is headquartered in Adelanto.

It serves Adelanto and portions of Victorville.

Students at the high school level attend Victor Valley Union High School District, with 9–12 students attending Adelanto High School campus on Mojave Road operated by VVUHSD starting in the 2014–2015 School Year.

Schools
K–8 schools:
El Mirage School
George Visual & Performing Arts Magnet School

Middle schools:
Columbia Middle School
Melva Davis Academy of Excellence STEAM Middle School
Mesa Linda Middle School

Elementary schools:
Adelanto Elementary School
Donald F. Bradach Elementary School
Eagle Ranch Elementary School
Gus Franklin, Jr. STEM School
Morgan Kincaid Preparatory School of Integrated Studies
Theodore Vick School
Victoria Magathan Elementary School
West Creek Elementary School
Westside Park Elementary School

Credit Recovery/BRIDGES Program
Adelanto Virtual Academy

Former schools

Desert Trails Elementary School was previously in the district. Prior to its 2013 closure it had the lowest test scores in AESD. In addition almost 75% of the 6th students in Desert Trails performed below grade level in mathematics.  Due to a Parent Trigger Initiative under the laws of the State of California, Desert Trails Elementary was officially closed and replaced by Desert Trails Preparatory Academy, a charter school. In December 2015 AESD voted not to renew the charter of Desert Trails Preparatory. In March 2016 the San Bernardino County Board of Education voted to hand authority over the charter school to the county government in a 3–2 vote, removing it from the district.

Additional closed campuses include George Elementary School and Sheppard Middle School, both on the grounds of the Southern California Logistics Airport.  George Visual and Performing Arts Magnet School on Bartlett Road replaces both campuses as a K–8 site, where the Sheppard Middle School site is utilized by Excelsior Charter Schools for their AME Campus.  The former George Elementary School site has reopened in 2017 as a mixed-use facility, starting as the AESD Professional Development Center for PD-Professional Learning Community instruction, as well as the Adelanto Virtual Academy which began operation in 2018–19.

References

External links
 

School districts in San Bernardino County, California
Victorville, California